The second and last season of Criminal Minds: Beyond Borders was ordered on May 16, 2016, by CBS. The season premiered on March 8, 2017. The series concluded on May 17, 2017.

Cast

Main 
 Gary Sinise as Unit Chief Jack Garrett
 Alana de la Garza as Senior SSA Clara Seger
 Daniel Henney as SSA Matthew "Matt" Simmons
 Tyler James Williams as Tech Analyst Russ "Monty" Montgomery
 Annie Funke as SSA Mae Jarvis

Criminal Minds characters 
 Kirsten Vangsness as Technical Analyst Penelope Garcia
 Joe Mantegna as Supervisory Special Agent David Rossi
 Paget Brewster as Supervisory Special Agent Emily Prentiss

Recurring 
 Kelly Frye as Kristy Simmons
 Ezra Dewey as Jake Simmons
 Declan Whaley as David Simmons
 Matt Cohen as Special Agent Ryan Garrett
 Sherry Stringfield as Karen Garrett
 Esai Morales as Mateo "Matt" Cruz
 Kim Rhodes as Executive Assistant Director Linda Barnes

Episodes

Ratings

References

2017 American television seasons
Season 2